El with descender (Ԯ ԯ; italics: Ԯ ԯ) is a letter of the Cyrillic script.

El with descender is used in the Khanty language, where it represents the voiceless alveolar lateral fricative .

El with descender (Ԯ ԯ) is the nineteenth letter of the Itelmen, introduced with the new Cyrillic alphabet during 1984-1988. In some publications El with hook is substituted by El with descender.

Up to the release of Ԯ in Unicode 7.0, the letters Ӆ or Ԓ have been used as an alternative to Ԯ. (Like a Latin letter N with descender)

Computing codes

See also
Ӆ ӆ : Cyrillic letter El with tail
Ԓ ԓ : Cyrillic letter El with hook
Ԡ ԡ : Cyrillic letter El with middle hook
Cyrillic characters in Unicode

References

Cyrillic letters with diacritics
Letters with descender (diacritic)